"Keep Your Hands off My Baby" is a song written by Gerry Goffin and Carole King.

Little Eva recording
The most notable recording was done by Little Eva, who had a No. 12 hit with the song on the Billboard charts in 1962.

Chart history

Other recordings
Other artists who have recorded versions of the song include:
The Beatles recorded the song for the BBC radio show Saturday Club on 22 January 1963, which was first broadcast four days later. They also performed it in the following month on their first British tour. It was released on their album, Live at the BBC, in 1994.
Kirsty MacColl 
Helen Shapiro 
Lindisfarne
Skeeter Davis
the Trashmen
Ol' 55
Wayne Fontana.

References

1962 singles
1981 singles
The Beatles songs
Songs with lyrics by Gerry Goffin
Kirsty MacColl songs
Songs written by Carole King
Song recordings produced by George Martin
Helen Shapiro songs
Little Eva songs
Song recordings produced by Gerry Goffin
1962 songs
Dimension Records singles
Polydor Records singles